Potomac State Forest is an 11,535-acre state forest in the state of Maryland near Oakland.

The forest offers a wide range of outdoor recreation opportunities, such as cross-country skiing, camping, fishing, hiking, and hunting.

See also
Maryland Forest Service - Official Site
List of Maryland state forests

External links
 Potomac State Forest

References 

Maryland state forests
Protected areas of Garrett County, Maryland